Roderick Martin may refer to:
Roderick Martin (athlete) (born 1959), Swedish pentathlete
Roderick Martin (sociologist) (born 1940), British sociologist